The 2014–15 season saw SG Sonnenhof Großaspach compete in the 3. Liga, in which they finished 15th.

Competitions

3.Liga

League table

Matches

References

External links
 Official team site
 SG Sonnenhof Großaspach at Weltfussball.de
 Das deutsche Fußball-Archiv historical German domestic league tables 
 eufo.de European club profiles and current rosters

SG Sonnenhof Großaspach seasons
Sonnenhof Großaspach